The Midtown Historic District in Midtown Atlanta, Georgia is a historic district that was listed on the National Register of Historic Places in 1999.  
It is roughly contiguous with what the Midtown Alliance organization calls the "Midtown Neighborhood", which is only part of the much larger Midtown neighborhood. The Midtown Local Historic District organization seeks to designate most of the current historic district as a "local historic district", which unlike simply being listed on the National Register, provides tools for preservation of the historic architecture.

It also included 168 non-contributing buildings and 47 non-contributing sites.

It includes works by Haralson Bleckley, W.A. Brightwell & Sons, Mitchell & Conklin, Lewis E. Crook, Willis F. Denny, Walter T. Downing, C.E. Frazier, Bruce and Morgan, Gottfried Norrman, Benjamin R. Padgett, Emil Seiz, Hentz, Adler & Shutze, Bleckley & Tyler, Harry L.Walker, and Lelia Ross Wilburn.

References

External links
 Midtown Local Historic District

Neighborhoods in Atlanta
Historic districts on the National Register of Historic Places in Georgia (U.S. state)
Queen Anne architecture in Georgia (U.S. state)
Bungalow architecture in Georgia (U.S. state)
Midtown Atlanta
National Register of Historic Places in Atlanta
National Register of Historic Places in Fulton County, Georgia